Merry Andrew can mean:

 Merry Andrew (film), a 1958 musical comedy starring Danny Kaye and Pier Angeli
 Merry Andrew, a play by Lewis Beach used as a basis for the 1934 film Handy Andy